Harrigan (also known as Detective Harrigan) is a British crime drama film, written by Arthur McKenzie and directed by Vince Woods, that premiered on 20 August 2013. Set in 1974, the film stars Stephen Tompkinson as DS Barry Harrigan, a no-nonsense copper driven by the sudden death of his wife and daughter at the hands of a vicious local thug.

Harrigan was released on DVD on 13 January 2014.

Plot
After returning from secondment to Hong Kong, DS Barry Harrigan (Stephen Tompkinson) finds that an old adversary, Dunstan (Craig Conway), a local gang leader who was responsible for the death of his wife and daughter in an arson attack, is targeting a young mother, Vickey Frizell (Amy Manson) and her two children.

After managing to help Vickey out of trouble, Harrigan makes it his personal mission to clean up Newcastle's most notorious estate, the Monkshire, by reopening the former police section house in a bid to rid the city of Dunstan and his associates once and for all.

Cast
 Stephen Tompkinson as DS Barry Harrigan
 Gillian Kearney as DS Bridie Wheland
 Maurice Roëves as Billy Davidson
 Mark Stobbart as DI Larson
 Darren Morfitt as DC Swift
 Bill Fellows as DS Colin Moss
 Jamie Cho as PC Lau
 Amy Manson as Vickey Frizell
 Craig Conway as Dunstan
 Ronnie Fox as Cole
 Steven Hillman as Stringer
 Ian Whyte as Ronnie
 John Bowler as Vince Jenkins
 Shaun Prendergast as Ch. Supt. Atkins
 Mike Elliot as DC Alan Trimble
 Dan Styles as Scott
 Val McLane as Lily
 Niek Versteeg as Gary Cole

Production
Harrigan was filmed on location in Gateshead, Newcastle and Hartlepool during January and February 2012, and was originally intended to be the pilot for a potentially ongoing television series. The character of Harrigan was based upon writer Arthur McKenzie, who served as a policeman in Newcastle during the 1960s and 1970s.

Reception
Harrigan holds a 14% approval rating on Rotten Tomatoes, on the basis of seven reviews with an average score of 4/10. Notably, the Daily Express commented that "there are few surprises in this cliché-ridden plucky effort that may have been better as a television production."

References

External links
 
 

2013 films
British crime films
Films set in 1974
2013 crime films
2010s English-language films
2010s British films